Libera Nos is a 2016 Italian-French documentary film written and  directed by Federica Di Giacomo. It won the Horizons competition at the 73rd edition of the Venice Film Festival. It depicts exorcisms of Sicilian Franciscan Father Cataldo Migliazzo.

References

External links  

2016 documentary films
Italian documentary films
French documentary films
Documentary films about Italy
2010s Italian films
2010s French films